is a Japanese former swimmer. She competed in the women's 200 metre breaststroke at the 1952 Summer Olympics.

References

External links
 

1935 births
Living people
Japanese female breaststroke swimmers
Olympic swimmers of Japan
Swimmers at the 1952 Summer Olympics
Place of birth missing (living people)
Asian Games medalists in swimming
Asian Games silver medalists for Japan
Swimmers at the 1954 Asian Games
Medalists at the 1954 Asian Games